Bisceglie is a station on Line 1 of the Milan Metro in Milan, Italy. The station opened on 21 March 1992 as a one-station extension from Inganni. It is the western terminus of the branch. The station is located between Via Bisceglie and Via Ferruccio Parri, within the municipality of Milan.

This terminus station provides a connection to local and intercity buses operated by ATM at an adjoining bus station.

References

Line 1 (Milan Metro) stations
Railway stations opened in 1992